Elizovo Airport , also known as Yelizovo Airport or Petropavlovsk-Kamchatsky Airport, is located in the Russian Far East city of Petropavlovsk-Kamchatsky, Kamchatka Krai.

Military operating unit

The base is home to the 175th Independent Shipborne Anti-submarine Helicopter Squadron, 317th Independent Composite Antisubmarine Aviation Regiment, Independent Unmanned Aerial vehicle Squadron and the 865th Fighter Aviation Regiment which are all part of the 7060th Order of Labour Red Banner Naval Aviation Air Base.

The 888th Fighter Aviation Regiment was formed from March 1942. It was deployed in Yelizovo and Ozerny until October 1945 flying the Bell P-63 Kingcobra fighter aircraft. After the war, it flew to the Baikovo airfield (formerly Japanese Kataoka). The regiment was disbanded as a result of reductions in the Soviet Armed Forces in 1958.

The main military operating unit is the 865th Fighter Aviation Regiment (865 IAP), which operates Mikoyan MiG-31 interceptor aircraft. Naval operations have also taken place here, most notably with the 317th Separate Composite Aviation Regiment (317 OSAP) operating Tupolev Tu-16R aircraft as late as 1992, and Beriev Be-12 and Tupolev Tu-95MS aircraft with unidentified units. As recently as July 2021, Google Maps satellite  imagery showed several dozen MiG-31 aircraft dispersed throughout the airfield, and a large number of turboprop transports and helicopters.

The 865th Fighter Aviation Regiment was activated as an Assault Aviation regiment in 1939. After two redesignations, it was renamed the 410th Assault Aviation Regiment in October 1944. It has been located at the base since 1945. In April 1949, it was renamed again as the 865th Fighter Aviation Regiment, and was later transferred to the Soviet Air Defence Forces, and renamed the 865th Fighter Aviation Regiment PVO. From April 1986, it was assigned to the 6th Air Defence Division, 11th Independent Air Defence Army, PVO, until its reassignment to the Pacific Fleet. On 1 July 1998, it was transferred to the Soviet Pacific Fleet. It was equipped with Sukhoi Su-15s from 1974 to 1985, and was reequipped with MiG-31s from 1985.

Airliner World ran a feature in their August 2008 issue on 'Aviation in Kamchatka,' leading with descriptions of Yelizovo. It confirmed the basing of 865 IAP and 317 OSAP, and commented 'the numbers of local military aircraft in open storage do catch the eye'...'difficult to assess whether the aircraft are active or not.' One photo showed a total of eleven MiG-31s parked closely together in two groups directly in front of two hardened aircraft shelters built into the hillside.

Runway reconstruction
Terminal and apron improvements are also included in the project.

New terminal 
In August 2017, Airports of Regions, an airport management company, had the winning bid in a competition to construct a new passenger terminal at the airport. Originally construction was scheduled to begin in 2018 with completion by 2021.  Construction delays have pushed back the expected completion date to August, 2023.

Statistics
Following a pattern where travel restrictions related to the COVID-19 pandemic had a significant impact on aviation world-wide, Elizovo experienced a 27% drop in airline traffic in 2020.  For the year there were 5,098 airline sorties from Elizovo, with Aeroflot, S7 Airlines, and Aurora topping the rankings of total passengers. Most Elizovo passengers were transported on Boeing 777-300ER, Airbus A319, and Airbus A320Neo airliners.  A total of 19 destinations (18 of them regularly scheduled) were on the airport's route network during 2020.

Airlines and destinations

References

External links

pkc.aero/en/ (official website in English)

 Airport Petropavlovsk-Kamchatsky (Yelizovo) Aviateka.ru (archived)

Airports in Kamchatka Krai
Kamchatka Peninsula
Russian Air Force bases
Soviet Air Force bases
Soviet Naval Aviation bases
Airports built in the Soviet Union
Soviet Air Defence Force bases